(born September 10, 1986) is a Japanese idol singer, songwriter, actor and model. He was born in Habikino, Osaka Prefecture, Japan.

Biography
Uchi Hiroki auditioned for Johnny & Associates in May 1999, at the age of twelve. He had no interest in the entertainment industry, instead dreaming about a professional baseball career, but was signed up to audition by his mother.  He became the vocalist of the junior's group V. West. At this time, he had the TV show "Weekly V. West" with other members of the group.  Three years later, in December 2002, Uchi became a member of Kanjani8, which was officially formed.
Around the same time, Uchi started filming his first drama, Doremisora. In 2003, Uchi and his best friend, another Kanjani8 member, Nishikido Ryo, were asked to join the band NEWS along with seven other members. The same year, Uchi took part in the drama Boku no Ikiru Michi, and was awarded the Nikkan Sports Drama Grand Prix as a best newcomer.

In 2004, Uchi made his debut with NEWS (The song: Kibou-Yell) and with Kanjani8 in the Kansai area, then nationwide.
While performing in Hey! Say! Dream Boy shows (along with KAT-TUN), Uchi was diagnosed with and hospitalized for pulmonary pneumothorax, a condition which causes holes to form in the lining of the lungs. Uchi was pulled from both shows for the urgent surgery to repair the three holes in his left lung.
After rehabilitation, Uchi returned in June for the release of NEWS’s "Teppen" single as well as filming the drama Ganbatte Ikimasshoi!

In July 2005, he was temporarily suspended from all activities.

In early January 2008, it was announced that Uchi would graduate from trainee to solo status with a leading role in the drama Isshun no Kaze ni Nare, a Fuji TV special airing for the last four days of February. His status became a "junior" again. In March, he also joined the cast of NTV drama Osen for one of the leading roles. In November, it was announced he would start his solo concerts in Yokohama and Osaka in collaboration with Question?.

In 2009, Uchi took part in Playzone 2009 "Letters from the sun" with Kis-My-Ft2 band. The same year, he starred in the anime-based drama Yamato Nadeshiko Shichi Henge with other JE stars Kamenashi Kazuya and Tegoshi Yuya. Latter this drama was awarded Nikkan Sports Drama Grand Prix as a best drama.

In 2010, in a news article concerning Hiroki Uchi becoming involved with the Japanese production of Broadway musical Guys and Dolls, the president of Johnny & Associates, Johnny Kitagawa, stated that Uchi has been permanently removed from both Kanjani8 and NEWS and will instead focus on solo work and acting.

Discography

Filmography

TV dramas

Movies
2012: Shiritsu Bakaleya Koukou THE MOVIE as Sakuragi Ren
2013: Ninja Kids!!! Summer Mission Impossible as Doi Hansuke

Voice acting
2004: One Piece: Norowareta Seiken as Tōma

Stage plays
2007: Playzone: Change2Chance
2009: Playzone:    Letters from the Sun
2010: Guys and Dolls
2010: Endless Shock
2011: Endless Shock
2011: Ikemen Desu Ne Stage Play   (as Fujishiro Shu)
2012: Endless Shock
2012: Duet
2013: Za Odasaku
2013: Endless Shock

References

External links
Johnny's Entertainment

1986 births
Japanese male actors
Japanese idols
Japanese male pop singers
Living people
Kanjani Eight members
News (band) members
People from Habikino
Musicians from Osaka Prefecture